Wyszogród  is a village in the administrative district of Gmina Opatowiec, within Kazimierza County, Świętokrzyskie Voivodeship, in south-central Poland. As of 2011, the village had 37 males and 32 females, for a total population of 69 people.

References

Villages in Kazimierza County